Dragaljevac is a place located west of the city of Bijeljina in Republika Srpska, Bosnia and Herzegovina. There are 3 parts, Dragaljevac Donji, Dragaljevac Gornji and Dragaljevac Srednji.

External links
 Bijeljina official website (Serbian)

References

Bijeljina
Populated places in Bijeljina